Viza za budućnost was the first post-independence Bosnian TV series. Production started on June 22, 2002 in Sarajevo, Bosnia and Herzegovina. The first episode was aired on September 22, 2002. The final episode was filmed in Sarajevo on August 25, 2007 but was never aired. Viza za budućnost eventually became one of the region's most popular sitcoms.

History

Viza za budućnost began airing on 22 September 2002 on FTV. The series have got 206 episodes, divided into 6 seasons. The series was also aired in Serbia (RTS and Pink), Montenegro (RTCG and TV Vijesti), Macedonia (MRT) and Slovenia (RTV SLO). The last episode was shown on April 17, 2008.

Series overview

Plot

The Bosniak family Husika, whose apartment was destroyed in war, lives in apartment of Serb family Golijanin who left Sarajevo and emigrated to Norway. The drama begins when family Golijanin comes back from Norway to Sarajevo because of nostalgia and want their apartment back. The family Husika doesn't want to leave the apartment until they get the new one and they don't want to let Golijanins in. However, neither Golijanins want to give up and the whole thing ends up in court. On the day of Husika's eviction, a court decision is reached that two families must live together. And, despite the constant quarrels, these two families will become good friends.

Cast

Nada Đurevska as Mubera Polovina
Ljubiša Samardžić as Milan Golijanin
Jasna Diklić as Danica Golijanin
Admir Glamočak as Suad Husika
Meliha Fakić as Alma Husika
Mirvad Kurić as Rifat 'Rile' Polovina
Zoran Bečić as Oskar Prohaska
Amra Kapidžić as Belma Husika
Izudin Bajrović as Miro Zvrk
Emina Muftić as Sena Zvrk
Riad Ljutović as Tonči
Žan Marolt as Hrvoje Uskok
Sanda Krgo as Sanja
Lejla Zvizdić as Merima Husika
Maja Ibrahimpašić as Nejra Husika
Boris Dvornik as Vinko Uskok
Enis Bešlagić as Zela
Ermin Sijamija as Sabahudin Kreljo
Emir Hadžihafizbegović as Nadir Hadžić
Tanja Bošković as Sofija Jović
Boro Stjepanović as Aleksandar Jović
Sanja Burić as Dijana
Mario Drmać as Nenad Golijanin
Drago Buka as Nero

Series never finished
After the episode number 206, aired on April 17, 2008, there was an announcement of the next episode. That episode was supposed to be aired in Autumn 2008. However, that episode was never aired, and it is not known how the series has finished.

External links

RTVFBiH official website

2000s Bosnia and Herzegovina television series
2002 Bosnia and Herzegovina television series debuts
2008 Bosnia and Herzegovina television series endings
Bosnia and Herzegovina television series
Bosnia and Herzegovina television sitcoms
Television series about dysfunctional families
Television shows set in Sarajevo
Bosnia and Herzegovina culture
Federalna televizija original programming